The One and Only is a compilation album by British singer-songwriter Kirsty MacColl. It was released by Metro in 2001 and reached No. 34 on the UK Budget Albums Chart. The compilation features fourteen tracks from MacColl's recording career under Stiff Records.

Reception

Richie Unterberger of AllMusic described the compilation as "rather eccentric" and a "collection of above-average (mostly) '80s pop/rock".

Track listing

Charts

References

Kirsty MacColl albums
2001 compilation albums